The 1995 Michigan Wolverines football team represented the University of Michigan in the 1995 NCAA Division I-A football season. The team's head coach was Lloyd Carr. The Wolverines played their home games at Michigan Stadium.

Schedule

Roster

Game summaries

Virginia

Virginia led the #14 ranked Wolverines 17-0 heading into the 4th quarter only to see Michigan stage a dramatic comeback. Scott Dreisbach lofted a 15-yard scoring pass to Mercury Hayes for an 18–17 victory over Virginia as time expired in the season opening Pigskin Classic. It was the greatest comeback in Michigan history. The Wolverines, who scored on their final three possessions of the game, got the ball back with 2 minutes 35 seconds remaining. They needed it all as they drove 80 yards in 16 plays. Michigan had just 12 seconds left when Dreisbach dived for a first down at the Virginia 15-yard line. Three incompletions later, there were only four seconds left when Dreisbach threw the pass to Hayes and pandemonium broke loose at the "Big House". Dreisbach finished 27 of 52 for 372 yards passing with 2 interceptions and 2 touchdowns. The Wolverines gained only 52 yards on the ground.

at Illinois

Michigan led 10–0 at halftime, but blew the game open with 21 third quarter points on the way to a 38–14 victory over the #25 ranked Fighting Illini at Champaign. Tim Biakabutuka ran for 97 yards and 3 touchdowns and Chris Howard caught a 13-yard TD pass from Scott Dreisbach. Anthony Williams returned a punt 28 yards for a touchdown. The Wolverine defense held the Illini to 66 yards rushing.

Memphis

Tim Biakabutuka had another big day as he rushed for 143 yards and two touchdowns as the #11 Wolverines struggled to a 24–7 victory over the Tigers. Ed Davis added a touchdown run and Scott Dreisbach was efficient completing 13 of 21 passes for 162 yards. The Michigan defense held Memphis to 96 yards of total offense. Charles Woodson and Rob Sweet had interceptions for the Wolverines.

at Boston College

The Wolverine defense held Boston College to 188 yards of total offense and intercepted 4 passes as they grabbed an early lead and held on for a 23–13 victory over the Eagles. Chuck Winters, Scott King, Rob Sweet and Clarence Thompson each had one interception. Remy Hamilton kicked three field goals while Tim Biakabutuka and Ed Davis scored touchdowns for Michigan.

Miami (Ohio)

Michigan raced to a 31-0 halftime lead and despite giving up 19 third quarter points, they held on for a 38–19 victory over the Redhawks. Remy Hamilton kicked three field goals, Tim Biakabutuka ran for a touchdown and Brian Griese threw two touchdowns. Griese completed 14 of 24 passes for 192 yards. Mercury Hayes and Amani Toomer were on the receiving end of Griese's TD passes.

Northwestern

Despite Tim Biakabutuka rushing for 205 yards, #7 Michigan fell to #25 Northwestern 19–13 at Michigan Stadium. Darnell Autry rushed for 100 yards for the Wildcats and a Steve Schnurr 2 yard pass to Matt Hartl tied the game at 13-13. Sam Velanzisi kicked two field goals to give Northwestern the win and spur them on to winning the Big Ten title. Remy Hamilton kicked two field goals and Brian Griese ran for a touchdown to account for Michigan's points.

at Indiana

Michigan raced to a 24-3 halftime lead on the way to a 34–17 victory over the Hooseirs in Bloomington, IN. Tim Biakabutuka rushed for 111 yards and Brian Griese completed 14 of 21 passes for 127 yards. Griese threw two touchdown passes, one each to Amani Toomer and Jerame Tuman. The Wolverine defense held the Hoosiers to 40 yards rushing and had interceptions by Chuck Winters and Clarence Thompson. Remy Hamilton added two field goals.

Minnesota

Tim Biakabutuka ran for 196 yards and two touchdowns as the #9 ranked Wolverines routed the Golden Gophers 52–17 at the "Big House". Brian Griese completed 14 of 19 passes for 271 yards and 4 touchdown passes. Amani Toomer caught 5 passes for 177 yards and two TD receptions. Michigan finished with 623 yards of total offense.

at Michigan State

The Spartans led 14–3 at halftime thanks to a 70-yard Derrick Mason punt return TD. The Wolverines rallied behind Brian Griese and led 25–21 with 3:38 left. Tony Banks guided the Spartans 88 yards over the next 2:24, with a fourth and 11 pass to Mason keeping the drive alive and a juggling catch later in the drive. Banks found Nigea Carter for a 25-yard TD with 1:14 left, finishing 26 for 34 with 318 yards in the 28–25 win for Michigan State. Tim Biakabutuka rushed for 191 yards and a touchdown for the Wolverines.

Purdue

A muddy field, freezing temperatures and wind gusting to 50 mph made Michigan's offense ineffective Saturday. The #13 Wolverines rode Remy Hamilton's field goal and Clarence Thompson's safety to a 5–0 victory over Purdue. It was the lowest-scoring game at Michigan Stadium since the Wolverines defeated Northwestern 7–0 in 1972. Michigan held Purdue to just four first downs, one in the first half. Both teams floundered while Michigan controlled the ball 37 minutes, 22 seconds, but the Wolverines gained only 283 yards on 79 plays.

at Penn State

The Nittany Lions jumped out to a 10–0 lead in the second quarter following a 49-yard field goal from Brett Conway and a 13-yard touchdown pass from Wally Richardson to Mike Archie. Michigan answered on a Brian Griese touchdown pass to Amani Toomer, but Conway added a 51-yard field goal to make it a 13–7 game at halftime. Remy Hamilton kicked a field goal to set the score at 13-10 heading into the fourth quarter. Richardson and Bobby Engram connected on a 12-yard scoring play in the fourth quarter to make it a 20–10 game. Michigan pulled to within three on an 18-yard touchdown run from Tim Biakabutuka. Then the Nittany Lions used a fake field goal attempt to seal a 27–17 victory over the Wolverines. With 2:40 to play and the Lions leading 20–17, kicker Brett Conway lined up for a 19-yard field goal attempt. The snap went to holder Joe Nastasi, who breezed into the end zone for a 2-yard touchdown to help clinch the win over the 12th ranked Wolverines.

Ohio State

Tim Biakabutuka rushed for 313 yards and a touchdown, and led #18 Michigan to a 31–23 upset over the No. 2 Buckeyes in front of 106,288 at Michigan Stadium. Michigan ran up 381 yards rushing while holding the Buckeyes to just 106. Overall, Michigan had 484 yards total offense to Ohio State's 392. Brian Griese hit Clarence Williams for a 2-yard touchdown for a 7–3 lead. The teams traded field goals, a 38-yarder by Michigan's Remy Hamilton, and a 37-yarder by Josh Jackson with six seconds left in the half, and the Wolverines were up 10–9 at halftime. Trailing 17–9, Ohio State got a one-yard touchdown dive by George, but did not convert on the two-point play. Williams scored from 8 yards to increase the Michigan lead to 24–15. A two-yard touchdown run by Biakabutuka with 7:55 left in the game would give the Wolverines all the cushion they would need at 31–15. Ohio State got to within eight points on a 19-yard touchdown pass from Bobby Hoying to Buster Tillman, and a two-point conversion, with 6:33 left in the game, but that was as close as the Buckeyes would get.

1995 Alamo Bowl

Texas A&M scored first on a nine-yard run by running back Eric Bernard to take a 7–0 lead. Michigan answered with a 41-yard touchdown pass from quarterback Brian Griese to wide receiver Amani Toomer, tying the game. Texas A&M scored again following a 27-yard field goal by kicker Kyle Bryant, and Texas A&M reclaimed the lead at 10–7. In the second quarter, Remy Hamilton kicked a 28-yard field goal for Michigan to tie the game at ten. Bryant kicked his second field goal of the game, a 49 yarder before half to give Texas A&M a 13–10 halftime lead. In the third quarter, Bryant added another 47-yard field goal to increase the lead to 16–10. Michigan's 26-yard field goal from Hamilton closed the margin to three, but Bryant added field goals of 31 and 37 yards to put the game out of reach, giving Texas A&M a 22–13 lead with 22 seconds left in the game. Griese's 44-yard touchdown pass to Toomer pulled Michigan to within 22–20 with only five seconds left. This was the final bowl win for the Southwest Conference, which disbanded the following spring. In the final AP poll, Texas A&M climbed to fifteenth and Michigan fell to seventeenth.

Statistical achievements
The team earned the fifth of six 1990s Big Ten rushing defense statistical championships for all games by holding opponents to 93.2 yards per game. The team also earned the fifth of five consecutive and six 1990s Big Ten rushing defense statistical championships for conference games by holding opponents to 88.1 yards per game. The team led the conference in total defense for conference games (314.5) and all games (284.8). The loss against Northwestern ended a streak of 19 consecutive wins in the series.

Tim Biakabutuka set the following records: single-season rushing attempts (303), eclipsing Jamie Morris' eight-year-old record and broken five years later by Anthony Thomas; and single-season rushing yards (1818), also eclipsing an eight-year-old record by Morris, but currently still standing. His November 25 single-game 313-yard performance in the Michigan–Ohio State football rivalry game remains second to Ron Johnson's 347-yard 1967 performance.

Mercury Hayes had a 7-reception 179-yard performance culminating in a game-winning, fourth down, time expired 15-yard touchdown catch on August 26, 1995, from Scott Dreisbach to seal an 18–17 win against Virginia in Michigan's greatest comeback, a record that stood for eight years until 2003, when the Wolverines pulled off a 21-point comeback against Minnesota. 
Dreisbach's 52-pass attempts surpassed the school record by Dick Vidmer of 47 set in 1967. The 372 yards gained broke Todd Collins' 1994 record of 352. Tom Brady would surpass both records in 1998. Later in the season against Michigan State, Dreisbach became 9th Michigan passer to accumulate 4 touchdown passes in a game, a record which has been matched but not broken. The reception was recorded against University of Virginia Cavaliers defensive backs Ronde Barber and Paul London in the Pigskin Classic to complete what was at the time the largest comeback in Michigan Football history (17 points) in Lloyd Carr's coaching debut. The game constituted one of the two wildest finishes in Michigan Football history according to ESPN.

Awards and honors
Co-captains: Jarrett Irons, Joe Marinaro
All-Americans: Jason Horn, Jon Runyan
All-Conference: Jason Horn, Jarrett Irons, Jon Runyan, Clarence Thompson, Charles Woodson, Rod Payne
Most Valuable Player: Tshimanga Biakabutuka
Meyer Morton Award: Jarrett Irons
Meyer Morton Award: Jay Riemersma
John Maulbetsch Award: Jon Jansen
Frederick Matthei Award: Jarrett Irons
Arthur Robinson Scholarship Award: Jay Riemersma
Dick Katcher Award: Jason Horn
Hugh Rader Jr. Award: Joe Marinaro
Robert P. Ufer Award: Jason Carr
Roger Zatkoff Award: Jarrett Irons

Coaching staff
Head coach: Lloyd Carr
Assistant coaches: Vance Bedford, Erik Campbell, Kit Cartwright, Mike DeBord, Jim Herrmann, Brady Hoke, Fred Jackson, Greg Mattison, Bobby Morrison
Trainer: Paul Schmidt
Managers: Jason Armstrong, Joe Allore, Adam Clous, Patrick Bolger, Jared Drinkwater, Michael Levine, Joel Gerring, Ed Magnus, Sami Samaha, Tibor Tuske

References

External links
  1995 Football Team -- Bentley Historical Library, University of Michigan Athletics History

Michigan
Michigan Wolverines football seasons
Michigan Wolverines football